The 2022 Kobe Challenger was a professional tennis tournament played on indoor hard courts. It was the 6th edition of the tournament which was part of the 2022 ATP Challenger Tour. It took place in Kobe, Japan between 14 and 20 November 2022.

Singles main-draw entrants

Seeds

 1 Rankings are as of 7 November 2022.

Other entrants
The following players received wildcards into the singles main draw:
  Shinji Hazawa
  Taisei Ichikawa
  Shintaro Imai

The following players received entry into the singles main draw using protected rankings:
  Tatsuma Ito
  Yūichi Sugita

The following players received entry from the qualifying draw:
  Chung Yun-seong
  Jason Jung
  Shintaro Mochizuki
  Naoki Nakagawa
  Marc Polmans
  Colin Sinclair

Champions

Singles

 Yosuke Watanuki def.  Frederico Ferreira Silva 6–7(3–7), 7–5, 6–4.

Doubles

 Shinji Hazawa /  Yuta Shimizu def.  Andrew Harris /  John-Patrick Smith 6–4, 6–4.

References

2022 ATP Challenger Tour
2022
2022 in Japanese tennis
November 2022 sports events in Japan